Thomas Jerome Ferrick (January 6, 1915 – October 15, 1996) was a Major League Baseball pitcher, pitching coach and scout. He batted and threw right-handed.

Early years
Born in New York City, Ferrick spent four years in an upstate New York seminary studying for the Roman Catholic priesthood while also a farmhand with the home team New York Giants.

He spent the  season with the Brooklyn Bushwicks, and pitched well enough to catch the eye of Philadelphia Athletics manager Connie Mack.

Philadelphia A's
Ferrick immediately shined upon his arrival in Philadelphia. He made his major league debut against the Boston Red Sox on April 19, and pitched three scoreless innings in relief. When the first place Cleveland Indians came to Shibe Park on a five-game winning streak for a three-game set against the last place A's on May 18–20, Ferrick appeared in two of the three games. He earned his first major league win in game one of the set, stepping in for an injured Johnny Babich in the fifth inning, and only allowing one Cleveland base runner to reach second base. In the third game of the set, Ferrick closed the game with two perfect innings to allow his team to hold onto a 6–5 lead and sweep the series.

Having made four starts for the A's, he pitched his only career shutout on August 21 against the St. Louis Browns. In spite of this one performance, he began to sputter toward the end of the season, going 2–5 with a 6.36 earned run average in August and September. He was selected off waivers by the Indians with five games left in the season, but did not appear in any games for his new club. He finished the season with an 8–10 record and 3.77 ERA in 36 games for the A's.

U.S. Navy
Ferrick appeared in 31 games for the 1942 Indians, going 3–2 with a 1.99 ERA, which would have led the American League had he pitched more innings. That Christmas, he enlisted in the U.S. Navy and served as a Shipfitter, Third-Class at Naval Station Great Lakes in Lake County, Illinois. In , Chief Petty Officer Ferrick participated in the Navy's Western Pacific Tour, playing for the fifth fleet team.

Return to MLB

On August 4, 1946, Ferrick earned both of his first two wins with the Browns in a doubleheader with his former club, the Philadelphia Athletics. After the season, the Browns sold Ferrick to the Washington Senators for a $7500 waiver price. With his new club, he would lose both games of a doubleheader on August 20, . He went 3–12 with a 3.77 ERA over two seasons for a team that finished in seventh place, but was among the league leaders in saves (9 & 10, respectively) both seasons he was in Washington. Following the  season, he was traded back to the Browns with John Sullivan and $25,000 for Sam Dente.

At the  trade deadline, he, Joe Ostrowski and Leo Thomas were traded to the New York Yankees for Jim Delsing, Don Johnson, Duane Pillette and Snuffy Stirnweiss plus $50,000.

New York Yankees
With a winning ball club for the first time in his career, Ferrick helped the Yankees jumped from a margin of 4.5 games back of the Detroit Tigers to win the American League. He was 1–0 in five appearances against the Tigers, holding them scoreless over a total of 10.2 innings pitched. Overall, Ferrick went 8–4 with a 3.65 ERA and nine saves. He was called by manager Casey Stengel "Our most important individual performer in our drive to the top." He made one appearance in the  World Series against the Philadelphia Phillies, pitching the final inning of game three to earn the win.

Ferrick started the  season with the Yankees, but after poor pitching performances against the Tigers and Red Sox, he was packaged with Bob Porterfield and Fred Sanford, and sent to the Washington Senators for Bob Kuzava.

Coaching & scouting career
A season later, when Indianapolis manager Birdie Tebbetts was named manager of the Cincinnati Redlegs, he brought Ferrick along to serve as his pitching coach. He later served as pitching coach for the Philadelphia Phillies, Detroit Tigers (–) and Kansas City Athletics (–).

In , he joined the expansion Kansas City Royals as a "special assignment scout with emphasis on pitching", and scouted for the club for over twenty years before retiring.

Career stats

Ferrick had exceptional control, allowing just 227 walks in 674 innings pitched, and uncorking just nine wild pitches over his nine-year career. The only batter he ever hit with a pitch was Chicago White Sox second baseman Cass Michaels in 1949.

Personal life
Tom Ferrick died from heart failure at age 81 in Lima, Pennsylvania. His son, Tom Jr., is a former newspaper columnist for The Philadelphia Inquirer, and often recounted anecdotes of his father's playing career in his column. He also had another son and four daughters.

References

External links

Spink, C.C. Johnson, editor, The Baseball Register. St. Louis: The Sporting News, 1965.

1915 births
1996 deaths
Major League Baseball pitchers
Philadelphia Athletics players
Cleveland Indians players
St. Louis Browns players
Washington Senators (1901–1960) players
New York Yankees players
Baseball players from New York City
Greenwood Chiefs players
Richmond Colts players
Jersey City Giants players
Indianapolis Indians players
Detroit Tigers coaches
Philadelphia Phillies coaches
Kansas City Athletics coaches
Major League Baseball pitching coaches
Cincinnati Redlegs coaches
Kansas City Athletics scouts
Kansas City Royals scouts
Oakland Athletics scouts
United States Navy personnel of World War II
United States Navy sailors